Orcheobius is a genus of parasitic alveolates of the phylum Apicomplexa.

History

The genus was created by Schuberg and Kunze in 1906.

The genus Cariniella was synonymised with Orcheobius by Levine in 1980.

Taxonomy

There are two species known in this genus.

Description

The oocysts have 25 or more sporocysts.

Each sporocyst produces 4 sporozoites.

The gamonts are elongated.

During syngny, four microgametes associate with the macrogamete. One microgamete penetrates the macrogamete and the remaining three die off.

Host records

O. carinii - frog (Leptodactylus ocellatus)
O. herpobdellae - leech (Herpobdella atomaria)

References

Apicomplexa genera